Sriram Engineering College is an engineering institution situated in Perumalpattu, Chennai City, Tiruvallur Dt., Tamil Nadu, India. The college is affiliated to Anna University Chennai.

Established in 1993 by Thiru M.E. Devarajan (founder and chairman of Sriram Educational Trust), this college is one of the oldest engineering colleges in Tamil Nadu. It has produced around 9000 engineering graduates getting placed in various companies.

Academics
 B.E. Electronics and Communication Engineering
 B.E. Mechanical Engineering
 B.E. Computer Science and Engineering
 B.E. Electrical and Electronics Engineering
 B.E. Automobile Engineering
 B.E. Civil Engineering
 B.Tech. Information Technology
 B.Tech. Chemical Engineering
 B.Tech. Artificial Intelligence

PG Programmes
 M.E. AE (Applied Electronics)
 M.E. CSE (Computer Science and Engineering)
 M.E. EST (Embedded System Technologies)
 M.E. ME ( Manufacturing Engineering)

Alumni
Sriram Engineering College has a number of alumni that have graduated from various departments and have reached peak of excellence in their chosen professions. Among the notable ones is Praveen Linga (1996-2000), a gold medalist in the department of chemical engineering, now a professor at the National University of Singapore.

References

External links
 

Engineering colleges in Tamil Nadu
Colleges affiliated to Anna University
Education in Tiruvallur district
Educational institutions established in 1992
1992 establishments in Tamil Nadu